The Men's sprint competition at the 2018 UCI Track Cycling World Championships was held on 2 and 3 March 2018.

Results

Qualifying
The top four riders advanced directly to the 1/8 finals; places 5 to 28 advanced to the 1/16 final.

1/16 finals
Heat winners advanced to the 1/8 finals.

1/8 finals
Heat winners advanced to the quarterfinals.

Quarterfinals
Matches were extended to a best-of-three format hereon; winners proceeded to the semifinals.

Semifinals
Matches were extended to a best-of-three format hereon; winners proceeded to the final.

Finals
The final classification were determined in the medal finals.

References

Men's sprint
UCI Track Cycling World Championships – Men's sprint